Israel Horowitz or Horovitz may refer to:

Israel Albert Horowitz, American international chess master
Israel Horowitz (producer), American classical music record producer, editor, columnist
Israel Horovitz, American playwright and screenwriter